Allium ochotense, the Siberian onion, is a primarily East Asian species of wild onion native to northern Japan, Korea, China, and the Russian Far East, as well as on Attu Island in Alaska.

Some authors have considered A. ochotense as belonging to the same species as A. victorialis, but more recent authorities have treated it as a distinct species.

Description 
The leaves are 1–3 glabrous, broadly elliptic,... perianth (flower) whitish-green". The plant is slow-growing, and aside from seed-propagation, "A. victorialis has two vegetative propagation systems; one is tillering and the other is adventitious buds".

The plant has an intense garlic-like odor (cf. allicin content) that is thought more intense than garlic itself.

Etymology
Allium is the ancient Latin name for garlic.

The specific epithet, ochotense, was given by Yarosláv Ivánovich Prokhánov (Яросла́в Ива́нович Проха́нов) [1902-1965], a Soviet botanist, systematist, geographer, geneticist, Doctor of Biological Science, and professor. It was presumably named in reference to the Okhotsk region of Russia, a place where this species is known to occur.

Distribution
Allium ochotense is centered in the Amur River basin area, thus, it occurs in the  Amur, Khabarovsk, Primorye regions of Siberia, and into Sakhalin and Kuril Islands within the Russian Far East. In China, the plant grows in Inner Mongolia and China (Heilongjiang, Jilin, Liaoning), Hebei, Henan, Anhui, Hubei, Zhejiang, Shaanxi, Shanxi, Gansu, and Sichuan). The range also includes Korea, in Ulleung Island and the high mountains (over ) in the Korean peninsula, including Baekdu Mountain, and Japan (Hokkaido and Honshu), in colonies from Hokkaido down to the Kinki area (Nara Prefecture), in coniferous and mixed forested wetlands in subalpine terrain. The plant's range extends nominally into the United States, but A. ochotense is only found natively growing on Attu Island, the westernmost island of the Aleutian archipelago. There are colonies on Unalaska Island, but they are thought to be introduced.

Cultivation 
From around 1990, it has been grown horticulturally in Hokkaido and snowy regions on the eastern side of Honshū. Outbreaks of plant disease have been reported in these onion paddy farms. It requires approximately four years from sowing to harvest.

Cultivars 
At Utsunomiya University's Agriculture Department, the research group led by then-assistant professor Nobuaki Fujishige developed an A. ochotense × A. tuberosum (garlic chives) hybrid, which they dubbed . It resembles the garlic chive in outward appearance, but inherits the thick-stalked trait of A. victorialis, and like the garlic chive, is ready for harvest after 1 year. It has been sold in the commercial market since 2008 in Nagai, Yamagata.

Chemistry
Researchers have identified 1-propenyl disulfides and vinyldithiins as odor compounds. Specific odor agents include: "methyl allyl disulfide (Chinese chive odor), diallyl disulfide (garlic-like odor), and dimethyl disulfide and methyl allyl trisulfide (pickles-like odor)".

Uses

Culinary

China 
In China its name is given as gecong or shancong. Its use may be not be widespread. One source only mentions that the Jiarongic minority harvest the "tender unfolding leaves" which they sun-dry and serve on special occasions.

Japan 
The Japanese name  means literally "a (type of) garlic that a gyōja makes use of as food," where a gyōja signifies a monk or a lay person engaged in ascetic training outdoors (cf. , Shugendō). Much of its flourishing habitat occurs in nature reserves such as national parks. Hence it is considered a scarce sansai (wild-harvested vegetable), and commands high prices at the market.

Siberian onion is an important ethnobotanic food plant for the indigenous Ainu people of Japan. In the Ainu language it is called pukusa, kitobiru, or ( since "biru/hiru" is a Japanese word for onion-type plants), simply kito. Siberian onion comes into season in Hokkaido for foraging from early to mid-May. The Ainu traditionally gather the leaves (but not the whole bulb), which are chopped up and dried for future use.

In modern days, the leafstalk can be preserved by steeping in soy sauce, or the fresh leaves can be made into ohitashi (parboiled and served plain or with dashi flavor), made into gyōza (pot-sticker dumplings), or blended into a tamagoyaki-type omelet. The young unraveled leaves with a stalk about 1 cm (half-inch) have rich flavor and fragrance and are especially prized. Also, the stalks being commercially grown by blanching (cf. white asparagus) have been gaining popularity.

There are a number of inedible or poisonous plants that can be mistaken for victory onions in Japan, and those reported cases of consumption and illness include: Veratrum album (Ja: baikeisō), Veratrum stamineum (Ja: ko-baikeisō), Colchicum autumnale (Ja:inu-safuran) and lily of the valley. The distinctive smell should tell it apart.

Korea 

In Korea, the A. ochotense and A. microdictyon are called sanmaneul ("mountain garlic"). While the official name for A. ochotense is Ulleung sanmaneul ("Ulleung Island mountain garlic"), the most common name used by Korean people is myeongi, whose romanized form (along with Siberian onion) is an English name of the plant. Myeongi is also called myeonginamul, because it is considered a namul (vegetable).

Myeongi is a specialty of Ulleung Island, where the leaves grow wider and hardier.

The leaves and the scaly bulb of myeongi are most often eaten as a namul-type side dish, or as a ssam vegetable for a samgyeopsal (grilled pork belly) meal. Myeongi is also eaten pickled as a jangajji-type side dish, or used as the last ingredient in dak-gomtang ("chicken bone soup").

Siberia 
In Siberia, the young shoots are eaten.

Medicinal

Japan 
In Japan, pukusa or Siberian onion has been used as a folk remedy among the Ainu. For example, it is administered as a diuretic to treat urine blockage relating to certain stomach disorders.

Korea 
In traditional Korean medicine, myeongi was considered to be a warming herb, a stomachic, and a detoxicant. As a herb, it was used to treat indigestion, heatburn, small abscesses, and bites and stings from venomous insects. The seed was used to treat nocturnal emission.

Magical 
In Japan, Ainu folklore held that due to its odor, Siberian onion was capable of repelling diseases. When an epidemic broke out, the onion would be left hanging at the entrances to the village or dangled from the eaves of each house.

Gallery

See also 
 Allium ursinum (ramsons)
 Allium tricoccum (ramps)

References 

ochotense
Flora of the Aleutian Islands
Flora of Eastern Asia
Flora of China
Flora of the Russian Far East
Japanese vegetables
Korean vegetables
Onions
Namul
Plants described in 1753
Taxa named by Carl Linnaeus